C. Eugene Farnam (1916-1999) was an American politician who served as Massachusetts Insurance Commissioner and as a member of the Massachusetts House of Representatives.

Early life
Farnam was born on December 31, 1916, in the Charlestown neighborhood of Boston. He attended Medford High School, Northeastern University, and the University of Miami.

Political career
Farnam was a member of the Medford Board of Aldermen from 1948 to 1949. From 1951 to 1957 he represented the 26th Middlesex District in the Massachusetts House of Representatives. From 1962 to 1971 he was the state insurance commissioner.

Business career
While serving in the House of Representatives, Farnam was a group representative for the Hardware Mutual Casualty Co. He was the owner of C. Eugene Farnam Insurance Agency in Medford. After retiring as state insurance commissioner in September 1971, he became a consultant to the insurance industry and the United States Department of Transportation.

Death
Farnam died on November 8, 1999, in Peabody, Massachusetts.

See also
 1951–1952 Massachusetts legislature
 1953–1954 Massachusetts legislature
 1955–1956 Massachusetts legislature

Notes
1. The 26th Middlesex District sent three representatives to the Massachusetts House of Representatives during Farnam's tenure. In 1957, Farnam and John F. Zamparelli were succeeded by Alexander J. Cella and Michael Catino. The third member, Thomas J. Doherty, was reelected.

References

1916 births
1999 deaths
20th-century American politicians
Northeastern University alumni
University of Miami alumni
Republican Party members of the Massachusetts House of Representatives
People from Medford, Massachusetts